This is a list of singles that have peaked in the top 10 of the French Singles Chart in 2015. 68 singles were in the Top 10 this year which 12 were on the number-one spot.

Top 10 singles

Entries by artists
The following table shows artists who achieved two or more top 10 entries in 2015. The figures include both main artists and featured artists and the peak positions in brackets.

See also
2015 in music
List of number-one hits of 2015 (France)

References

External links 
 LesCharts.com

Top
France top 10
Top 10 singles in 2015
France 2015